Andriy Oleksandrovych Malchevskyi (born 1 December 1968) is a Ukrainian former footballer who is last known to have played as a forward for Olimp (Kiev).

Career

In 1996, Malchevskyi signed for Ukrainian third division side Sistema-Borex from Xorazm in Uzbekistan, before joining Ukrainian fourth division club Elektron (Romny).

In 2000, he signed for East Bengal in India after playing for Bangladeshi team Mohammedan.

References

External links
 

Living people
1968 births
Ukrainian footballers
Ukrainian expatriate footballers
Expatriate footballers in Uzbekistan
Expatriate footballers in Bangladesh
Expatriate footballers in India
Ukrainian expatriate sportspeople in Uzbekistan
Ukrainian expatriate sportspeople in Bangladesh
Ukrainian expatriate sportspeople in India
Mohammedan SC (Dhaka) players
East Bengal Club players
Churchill Brothers FC Goa players
FC Inter Boyarka players
FC Qizilqum Zarafshon players
Ukrainian Second League players
FC Elektron Romny players
Association football forwards